Lipat Varabiev (born April 8, 1951) is a Romanian sprint canoer who competed from the early 1970s to the early 1980s. He won four medals at the ICF Canoe Sprint World Championships with one gold (C-1 500 m: 1977), two silvers (C-1 10000 m: 1973, C-2 10000 m: 1977), and one bronze (C-1 10000 m: 1971).

Varabiev also competed at the 1980 Summer Olympics in Moscow, finishing fifth in the C-1 1000 m and seventh in the C-1 500 m events.

References

1951 births
Living people
Canoeists at the 1980 Summer Olympics
Olympic canoeists of Romania
Romanian male canoeists
Romanian people of Russian descent
ICF Canoe Sprint World Championships medalists in Canadian